Ever Decreasing Circles is a British sitcom which ran on BBC1 between 1984 and 1989, consisting of four series and one feature-length special. It was written by John Esmonde and Bob Larbey, and it reunited them with Richard Briers, who had starred in their previous hit show, The Good Life.

It was made toward the end of a run of British comedies focussing on the aspirational middle class,
with the Guardian describing it as having "a quiet, unacknowledged and deep-running despair to it that in retrospect seems quite daring".

Characters and plot
Richard Briers plays Martin Bryce, an obsessive, middle-aged man at the centre of his local suburban community in Mole Valley, East Surrey. This relatively unsympathetic character was the antithesis of Tom Good. Briers said that it was his favourite sitcom role. The show's signature running gag (which appeared in almost every episode) was Martin walking past the telephone in his hallway and turning the receiver around.
 
Martin is married to the domesticated and patient Ann (Penelope Wilton) and has a settled, orderly lifestyle until he encounters their new next-door neighbour, ex-British Army officer and Cambridge Blue Paul Ryman (Peter Egan). Paul is everything Martin is not – adventurous, laissez-faire, flippant, witty, handsome and charming; in the words of Martin, a "couldn't care less, come on life ... amuse me, merchant". He attempts to join in with the activities of Martin and his friends, but his fresh thinking causes Martin to see him as a rival who might want to "take over" Martin's self-appointed role as organiser. Martin's obsession with order and stability also leads him to get upset at Paul's minor changes to routine, such as sitting at a different table in the local pub. Paul runs his own business, a hair salon, and later, a health studio. Martin, by contrast, has a humdrum white-collar job at Mole Valley Valves, a company named after an area of Surrey.

The other regular characters were Howard and Hilda Hughes (Stanley Lebor and Geraldine Newman), another married couple who generally add lighter humour to the plots. They are long-standing friends and neighbours of Martin's, who share some of his obsessiveness whilst having plenty of quirks of their own (such as often wearing "his and hers" matching outfits), but are also attracted by Paul's personality. Although Howard and Hilda are often seen as being rather timid, they have strong moral values and can be very forthright in chastising other characters (usually Martin or Paul) when they believe them to have done something wrong.

An undercurrent running throughout the series is the unresolved sexual tension and flirting between Paul and Ann. Martin sometimes seems oblivious to the attraction between Ann and Paul but in one episode, he wrongly believes that they have run off together. Martin leaves home, leaving Ann a note wishing her happiness and stating that he will always love her. Graham Rinaldi notes that "Briers' performance is poignant and genuinely moving as he wrestles with the character's inner turmoil." Martin's relationship with Paul is double-edged. Paul is always friendly to Martin, who veers between thinly disguised hatred and grudging admiration. Paul also solves a marital crisis in one episode when Martin is tricked by a colleague into believing he had had a drunken one-night stand while away on business and admitting to Ann his infidelity. Paul cons the colleague into an admission of the trick in front of Ann, restoring her faith in Martin.

Central to the show is Martin's envy of Paul. Paul is shown to be significantly better than Martin at many things, notably cricket, where Paul joins the local team and promptly smashes all the records that Martin proudly holds. The two later play in a snooker tournament, where Martin is delighted to find that Paul is useless (the tournament coincides with Howard's anger at being seen as "a loser", causing him to defeat Martin in the final). A parallel is drawn with an incident from Martin's childhood in which his own "gang" was taken over by a new boy.

The show also featured guest appearances by Peter Blake, Ronnie Stevens, Victoria Burgoyne,Ray Winstone, Pamela Salem, and Suzan Crowley.

After four series, Ever Decreasing Circles ended on Christmas Eve 1989 with an 80-minute finale entitled "Moving On" ("New Horizons", on the DVD release) in which Martin's employer, Mole Valley Valves, merges with another company (Lee Valley Valves) and moves to Oswestry. Ann discovers she is pregnant, and, despite Martin initially resenting the unborn child for forcing him to move away from The Close, the story ends with the couple bidding farewell to their neighbours. The final scene sees Martin standing in his empty hallway, going over to the telephone (the only thing left from the Bryces' ownership), and turning the receiver around, suggesting that Martin's obsessiveness will live on.

Creation
The series originated in John Esmonde and Bob Larbey's 1984 stage play Hiccups, which featured versions of the characters as they would later appear in the television series. Martin was played by Sam Kelly.

The series title supposedly originated in a meeting to brainstorm possible titles, when after other titles had been rejected somebody commented that "we're going round in ever decreasing circles".

Critical response
The show was voted number 52 in the BBC's Britain's Best Sitcom poll in 2003. At its peak, it attracted television audiences of around 12 million.

Reappraising the series, Andy Dawson in the Daily Mirror notes that "Ever Decreasing Circles strayed far from the well-worn path that other Britcoms trudged along in the 70s and 80s. There was a very real darkness at the heart of it, with Martin existing in what was almost certainly a state of permanent mental anguish."

Ricky Gervais has cited the series as one of his key influences, and following Briers' death said he would waive the repeat fees on The Office if Ever Decreasing Circles were repeated on BBC One.

Filming locations
Although the show is set in Surrey, the external location scenes were filmed in Sussex.

Cast

Episode list

Series One

Series Two

Series Three

Series Four

DVD release
The complete series of Ever Decreasing Circles was released on DVD in 2007.

References

External links
 
 
 

1984 British television series debuts
1989 British television series endings
1980s British sitcoms
BBC television sitcoms
English-language television shows
Television series about marriage
Television shows set in Surrey